Bummellotte is a 1922 German silent film directed by Wolfgang Neff and starring Maria Zelenka.

Cast
In alphabetical order
 Peter Arnolds as Henry  
 Karl Elzer as Herr Kosemann  
 Karl Falkenberg as Hochstapler Mr. Lengforth  
 Maria Forescu as Frau Baum 
 Willy Kaiser-Heyl 
 Lina Salten as Justizratstochter  
 Robert Scholz 
 Maria Zelenka as Lotte

References

Bibliography
 Rudmer Canjels. Distributing Silent Film Serials: Local Practices, Changing Forms, Cultural Transformation. Routledge, 2011.

External links

1922 films
Films of the Weimar Republic
Films directed by Wolfgang Neff
German silent feature films
German black-and-white films